Giacomo Tranchida (born 2 February 1963 in Valderice) is an Italian politician.

He joined the Democratic Party of the Left in 1991 and was elected mayor of Valderice in 1994 and re-elected for a second term in 1998. As a member of the Democratic Party, he was then mayor of Erice from 2007 to 2017.

Tranchida was elected mayor of Trapani at the 2018 Italian local elections. He took office on 13 June 2018.

See also
2018 Italian local elections
List of mayors of Trapani

References

External links
 

1963 births
Living people
Mayors of places in Sicily
People from Trapani
Democratic Party (Italy) politicians